Brendon Reddy (born 6 November 1983) is a South African cricketer. He played 34 first-class and 61 List A matches between 2000 and 2008. He was also part of South Africa's squad for the 2002 Under-19 Cricket World Cup.

References

External links
 

1983 births
Living people
South African cricketers
Easterns cricketers
Titans cricketers
Cricketers from Durban